Nalanda district is one of the thirty-eight districts of the state of Bihar in India. Bihar Sharif is the administrative headquarters of this district. The districts contain the ancient Nalanda Mahavihara a UNESCO World Heritage site. Nalanda is located in the Magadh region of southern Bihar.

History
Nalanda became a fully-fledged district when it was split from Patna on 9 November 1972.

Geography
The Phalgu, Mohane, Jirayan, and Kumbhari rivers flow through it. The district is a part of Patna Division. Majority of the land in the district is fertile land of Indo Gangetic plane. In the extreme South, there lies the hills of Rajgir. There is also one small hillock in the district headquarters of Bihar Sharif.

Flora and fauna

Demographics

According to the 2011 census Nalanda district has a population of 2,877,653, roughly equal to the nation of Mongolia or the US state of Kansas. This gives it a ranking of 134th in India (out of a total of 640), and 18th in state. Its population growth rate over the decade 2001-2011 was 21.18%. Nalanda has a sex ratio of 921 females for every 1000 males, and a literacy rate of 66.41%. 15.91% of the population lives in urban areas. Scheduled Castes and Scheduled Tribes make up 21.12% and 0.05% of the population respectively.

At the time of the 2011 Census of India, 56.27% of the population in the district spoke Magahi, 37.28% Hindi and 5.69% Urdu as their first language.

Politics 
Since Kurmis are dominant in Nalanda, it is also known by the name Kurmistan in political circle. Nalanda district is the birthplace of Chief Minister of Bihar, Nitish Kumar. Kumar has reportedly been a popular face amongst the voters of this district. The Nalanda district comprises Nalanda Lok Sabha constituency, which can further be fragmented into seven Legislative Assembly constituencies. In 2015 Bihar Assembly elections, Janata Dal (United) (JDU), the political party led by Kumar was able to win five out of seven Legislative Assembly constituencies of the district. It has been stated that preponderance of Kushwahas apart from Kurmis and sizeable population of Extremely Backward Castes, who are considered as the supporters of Kumar, has been the prime factor behind success of JDU in polls conducted in this district.

  

|}

Divisions
Sub Divisions: 3 - Modern District of Nalanda with HQ Biharsharif was established on 9 November 1972. Earlier it was Biharsharif sub-division of Patna district. Bihar Sharif, Rajgir, HilsaBlocks: 20 - Giriyak, Rahui, Noorsarai, Harnaut, Chandi, Islampur, Rajgir, Asthawan, Sarmera, Hilsa, Biharsharif, Ekangarsarai, Bena, Nagarnausa, Karai Parsurai, Silao, Parwalpur, Katrisarai, Bind, Tharthari.

Status
Nalanda district is fast developing and the ruins of the ancient Nalanda University or UNESCO Nalanda Archaeological Site attracts tourists from all over the world driving the local economy.

Economy
Agriculture is the backbone of the economy, with the majority of the population engaged in agriculture. Rice, wheat, maize, pulses, potato, fruits, and vegetables are the main crops. A newly setup Ordnance Factory, one of the 41 Indian Ordnance Factories has been set up by the Ministry of Defence, Government of India to manufacture artillery shells at Nalanda by the then Defence Minister Shri George Fernandes. Then there is the railway coach maintenance plant at Harnaut Block of Nalanda.

Tourism is well developed, with lakhs of people flocking at ruins of Nalanda University, Rajgir and Pawapuri. Rajgir was the first capital of Magadh Empire. Buddha had spent years at this place. Surrounded by five hills, it has got scenic views. Pawapuri, the Nirwana place of Mahavir, is holy place for the Jains. In 2006 the Ministry of Panchayati Raj named Nalanda one of the country's 250 most backward districts (out of a total of 640). It is one of the 36 districts in Bihar currently receiving funds from the Backward Regions Grant Fund Programme (BRGF).

Notable people

 Kalim Ajiz, a Padma Shri recipient and Urdu writer
 Satyadev Narayan Arya, politician and Governor of Haryana
 Abdul Qavi Desnavi, Urdu language writer, critic, Bibliographer, and linguist.
 Nawal Kishore Dhawal, a writer, poet, editor, and critic
 Ganesh Dutt, administrator and educationalist
 Manazir Ahsan Gilani, a writer and Islamic scholar
 Jabir Husain, politician
 Abhay Kumar, a poet-diplomat
 Aditya Kumar, actor
 Kaushalendra Kumar, MP of Nalanda
 Nitish Kumar, Chief Minister of Bihar and former MP from Nalanda
 Vikas Kumar, actor
 Sulaiman Nadvi, Islamic scholar, writer and Pakistani historian
 Mrityunjay Prabhakar, theatre director and dramatist
 L. S. N. Prasad, Indian paediatrician and Padma Shri recipient
 Siddheshwar Prasad, former MP and served as Governor of Tripura
 Pramod Ranjan, journalist
 Abul Muhasin Muhammad Sajjad, Islamic scholar, political activist and politician
 Syed Mohammed Saeed Raza, a Muslim scholar and professor
 Brahmadeo Narayan Singh, singer
 Ramchandra Prasad Singh, Member of Rajya Sabha and former IAS officer
 Veer Pratap Singh, Cricketer
 Tarkeshwari Sinha, politician
 Hari Uppal, founder of Bhartiya Nritya Kala Mandir and a Padma Shri recipient
 Vijay Kumar Yadav, Ex- MP from Nalanda
 Chandra Mohan Kumar, Named as Britain’s Top Doctor under the anesthesia category in 2010

References

External links
 Official website

 
Patna division
Districts of Bihar